The 10th Korea Drama Awards is an awards ceremony for excellence in television in South Korea. It was held at the Gyeongnam Culture and Art Center in Jinju, South Gyeongsang Province on October 2, 2017. The nominees were chosen from Korean dramas that aired from October 2016 to September 2017.

Nominations and winners
(Winners denoted in bold)

References

External links 
  
 10th Korea Drama Awards at Daum 

Korea Drama Awards
Korea Drama Awards
2017 in South Korea